"Say It Again" is a pop song written by Natasha Bedingfield, Adam Levine, and Mike Elizondo for Bedingfield's second album, N.B. (2007) and features Levine for background vocals. It was released as promotional single on 7 October 2007 in the United Kingdom. The song was released as a digital download only and failed to chart in the United Kingdom.

Music video
The music video was filmed in Mexico in late August 2007. The video features Bedingfield filming her own music video to the song with her boyfriend. It premiered on the "members area" section of Bedingfield's official website on 14 September 2007.

Formats and track listings
Digital download
(Released 7 October 2007)
 "Say It Again"  – 3:31

Personnel
The following people contributed to "Say It Again":

Natasha Bedingfield – lead vocals
Adam Levine – backing vocals 
Mike Elizondo – guitar, bass guitar, programming, keyboards
Trevor Lawrence – drums, cymbals
Adam Hawkins – engineering
David Kutch – mastering

Release history

References

External links
 natashabedingfield.com – Official website

2007 singles
Natasha Bedingfield songs
Pop ballads
Songs written by Natasha Bedingfield
Songs written by Adam Levine
2007 songs
Songs written by Mike Elizondo
Phonogenic Records singles
Song recordings produced by Mike Elizondo
2000s ballads